The 1931 Saint Mary's Gaels football team was an American football team that represented Saint Mary's College of California during the 1931 college football season.  In their 11th season under head coach Slip Madigan, the Gaels compiled an 8–2 record and outscored all opponents by a combined total of 119 to 65.  The Gaels' victories included a 13–7 besting of USC, a 14–0 besting of California, a 16–0 victory over Oregon, and a 7–2 victory over Southwest Conference champion SMU. The lone setbacks were losses to the Olympic Club (0–10) and UCLA (0–12).

Halfback Bud Toscani and guard Bill Fisher were selected by both the Associated Press and the United Press as first-team players on the 1931 All-Pacific Coast football team.

Schedule

References

Saint Mary's
Saint Mary's Gaels football seasons
Saint Mary's Gaels football